Jonathan Zion (born May 21, 1981) is a Canadian former professional ice hockey defenceman.

Playing career
Zion played junior hockey with the Ottawa 67's of the OHL from 1997-2002 and was a member of the 1999 Memorial Cup Champions. He was drafted in the fourth round, 110th overall, by the Toronto Maple Leafs in the 1999 NHL Entry Draft.

Professionally, Zion played in the AHL teams Cincinnati Mighty Ducks, Portland Pirates, Manchester Monarchs, Syracuse Crunch, Utah Grizzlies and Iowa Stars and the ECHL teams Richmond Renegades, Reading Royals, Greenville Grrrowl and Idaho Steelheads. He also represented several European teams, including HIFK of the Finnish SM-liiga and the Sheffield Steelers and Nottingham Panthers of the British Elite Ice Hockey League.

Zion joined the Allen Americans midway through the 2013-14 season, helping them claim their second Ray Davis Cup championship before retiring.

Career statistics

External links

1981 births
Living people
Ice hockey people from Ottawa
Allen Americans players
Chicago Express players
Cincinnati Mighty Ducks players
Greenville Grrrowl players
HIFK (ice hockey) players
Idaho Steelheads (ECHL) players
IK Oskarshamn players
Iowa Stars players
Manchester Monarchs (AHL) players
Nepean Raiders players
Nottingham Panthers players
Ottawa 67's players
Portland Pirates players
Reading Royals players
Richmond Renegades players
Sheffield Steelers players
Stavanger Oilers players
Syracuse Crunch players
Toronto Maple Leafs draft picks
Utah Grizzlies (AHL) players
Vienna Capitals players
Canadian expatriate ice hockey players in England
Canadian expatriate ice hockey players in Austria
Canadian expatriate ice hockey players in Norway
Canadian expatriate ice hockey players in Finland
Canadian expatriate ice hockey players in Sweden
Canadian ice hockey defencemen